Police Comics was a comic book anthology title published by Quality Comics (under its imprint "Comic Magazines") from 1941 until 1953. It featured short stories in the superhero, crime and humor genres.

Publication history
The first issue of Police Comics featured the debuts of Plastic Man, Phantom Lady, Human Bomb, Firebrand, and  Mouthpiece, all of which (except the latter) are characters that continued to be published decades later by DC Comics after it acquired Quality's properties. Firebrand, the initial lead feature, was soon eclipsed by Jack Cole's popular Plastic Man, who took the cover and the lead from issues #5-102. Other notable characters featured in Police Comics include Manhunter, who was introduced in Police Comics #8; #711, who was introduced in Police Comics #1; and Will Eisner's The Spirit, in the form of reprints of the character's newspaper comic strips.

After the popularity of superhero comics waned, Police Comics shifted with issue #103 (December 1950) to more naturalistic detective and crime-themed stories. The series ended in October 1953 with issue #127.

Character runs
 Plastic Man (#1–102)
 Mouthpiece (#1–13)
 Eagle Evans (#1–19)
 Manhunter (#8–101)
 Chic Carter (#1–18)
 711 (#1–15)
 Destiny (#16–36)
 Phantom Lady (#1–23)
 Flatfoot Burns (#24–67)
 Human Bomb (#1–58)
 Firebrand (#1–13)
 The Spirit (#11–102)
 Candy (#37–102)
 Honeybun (#59–88)
 Ken Shannon (#103–#127)

References

External links
 Police Comics at the Grand Comics Database
Read or download public domain issues of this series at the Digital Comic Museum

Comics magazines published in the United States
Quality Comics titles
1941 comics debuts
1953 comics endings
Magazines established in 1941
Magazines disestablished in 1953
Golden Age comics titles